Acantholochus is a genus of parasitic copepods belonging to the family Bomolochidae. Its members can only be distinguished from the closely related genus Hamaticolax by the absence of an accessory process on the claw of the maxillipeds.

Species 

It includes the following species:

The following species were formerly included in Acantholochus but are now placed in Hamaticolax:
Hamaticolax galeichthyos (Luque & Bruno, 1990)
Hamaticolax paralabracis (Luque & Bruno, 1990)
Hamaticolax unisagittatus (Tavares & Luque, 2003)

References

Poecilostomatoida